Waleed Abdulwahab Al-Ahmed (born 3 May 1999) is a Saudi Arabian professional footballer who plays as a defender for Saudi Professional League side Al-Faisaly.

Career
On 6 June 2014, Al-Ahmed signed for Al-Hilal despite undergoing a trial at Al-Nassr. On 30 July 2017, Al-Ahmed made his debut for Al-Hilal in the Arab Club Championship group stage match against ES Tunis. On 30 June 2019, he was chosen in the Saudi scholarship program to develop football talents established by General Sports Authority. On 10 October 2020, Al-Ahmed joined Al-Faisaly on a three-year contract. On 27 May 2021, Al-Ahmed started the 2021 King Cup Final against Al-Taawoun and helped Al-Faisaly win their first title.

Career statistics

Club

Honours
Al-Faisaly
 King Cup: 2020–21

International
Saudi Arabia U23
AFC U-23 Asian Cup: 2022

References

External links
 

1999 births
Living people
Sportspeople from Riyadh
Saudi Arabian footballers
Saudi Arabia youth international footballers
Saudi Arabia international footballers
Association football defenders
Al Hilal SFC players
Al-Faisaly FC players
Saudi Professional League players
Saudi First Division League players